LBHF may refer to:

 Lagos Black Heritage Festival, an annual event in Lagos which includes the Lagos Carnival
 London Borough of Hammersmith and Fulham, a London borough in West London